IEEE Magnetics Letters is a peer-reviewed scientific journal that was started in January 2010. It covers the physics and engineering of magnetism, magnetic materials, applied magnetics, design and application of magnetic devices, biomagnetics, magneto-electronics, and spin electronics. It publishes short articles of up to five pages in length and is a hybrid open access journal. The editor-in-chief is Massimiliano d'Aquino (University of Naples Federico II).

References

External links
 

Engineering journals
English-language journals
Hybrid open access journals
Magnetics Letters
Materials science journals
Publications established in 2010
Physics journals